GA-20 is an American blues band from Boston, Massachusetts. The band is named after the guitar amplifier manufactured by Gibson from 1950 to 1961. They primarily play Chicago blues.

Background
Together with fellow classic blues, R&B and early rock and roll lover Pat Faherty, Matthew Stubbs formed GA-20 in early 2018. Stubbs had already garnered much praise playing guitar for Charlie Musselwhite. He sought to put a new project together to do blues gigs aside from his Psych-Rock group The Antiguas. Faherty had spent several years studying blues guitar and teamed up with Stubbs to form a new group. Early performances by the band had a rotating group of musicians with Faherty and Stubbs as the core members. Some early performances used different drummers and various other musicians including Chris Anzelone on drums and Matt Prozialeck on harmonica, sometimes playing as a four-piece band. They adopted the name GA-20 in early 2018. The group became a trio by 2018 consisting of two guitars and drums. About a year after their formation, they scored a deal with Karma Chief Records. The group has been described as a  trio that plays stripped down ’50s/’60s-style Chicago blues with a lot of distortion and no bass.

Career

In December 2018, the band released the single "Naggin' On My Mind"  which featured Charlie Musselwhite and Luther Dickinson. The band was signed to Karma Chief Records. Their debut single "Naggin' On My Mind" was released in December 2018. It was recorded at Q Division Studios in Somerville, Massachusetts and was produced by Stubbs. Musselwhite performed harmonica on the track  and Dickinson was on slide guitar. Chris Anzelone played drums while, Dave Brophy was brought in for backing vocals and Matthew Prozialeck provided harmonica on a couple of tracks from the session. This session became the Lonely Soul album. 

In early January 2019, the group played at Theodores on Worthington Street,  Springfield, Massachusetts. By 2019, Tim Carman began playing drums at many of the bands shows and took over as the primary drummer.   Also that month, the band played an opening slot for Sister Sparrow & the Dirty Birds at The Narrows. The band then went on tour in support of Eli "Paperboy" Reed.
On May 18, 2019, they played at the Doheny Blues Festival in Dana Point, California. Their first record a 7" single was released in August 2019 with "Naggin' On My Mind" and "Sit Down Baby" on Karma Chief Records. Their debut album Lonely Soul was released on October 18, 2019. Their album debuted at number 2 on the Billboard top 15 Blues albums. In September 2020 they released an EP called "Live Vol. 1". The EP debuted at number 1 the Billboard Blues Charts.

Their August 2021 album GA-20 Does Hound Dog Taylor: Try It...You Might Like It! also debuted at number 1 on the Billboard Blues Chart of September 4, 2021 and was the first album ever to be played in its entirety on the Dr Boogie radio show. Released to mark the 50th anniversary of Hound Dog Taylor and the HouseRockers, Taylor's first disc, the GA-20 tracks are cover versions of songs from both that album and Taylor's second record Natural Boogie. 

In 2022 GA-20 toured in support of George Thorogood. They also did an international tour of Europe. In September they released the album Crackdown which debuted at number one on the Billboard Blues Albums charts.

Recognition
In 2018, GA-20 were nominated for a Boston Music Award for blues act of the year. They were nominated a second time in 2019. They were nominated for their first Blues Music Award for Best Emerging Artist

Band members 
Matthew Stubbs, guitar (2018-present)
Pat Faherty, lead vocals, guitar (2018-present)
Tim Carman, drums (2018-present)
Past Members
Chris Anzelone, drums (2018-2019)
Matt Prozialeck, Harmonica (2018)

Discography

References

American blues musical groups
Chicago blues ensembles
Musical groups from Boston